Delport is a South African Huguenot surname. Some notable persons with the surname include:

Cameron Delport (born 1989), South African cricketer
Carel Johannes Delport (born 1956), South African mass murderer
Colin Delport (born 1978), Zimbabwean cricketer
Louis Delport (born 1988), South African cricketer
Marius Delport (born 1994), Namibian cricketer
Ronnie Delport (born 1931), South African cricketer
Tertius Delport (born 1939), South African politician
Thinus Delport (born 1975), South African rugby union player

References

Surnames
Huguenot families